WOCR (89.1 MHz) — branded 89-1 The One — is a non-commercial FM campus radio located in Olivet, Michigan. The student-operated station, on the air 24/7, broadcasts on 89.1 FM and is owned by Olivet College Board of Trustees.

The station operates with 500 watts of power centering on the immediate Olivet area.

WOCR came on the air in 1975 as a 10 watt FM educational license radio station operating at a frequency of 89.7. Charles G. Mefford was the first general manager, obtaining an FCC license and the WOCR call letters, building the studios/tower and training a staff. He put the station on air with the help of Olivet College professors, Robert C. Fisher and Willis "Bill" Seldon and the eventual second general manager and student, Michael Oyster. A new transmitter a few years later took WOCR up to 125 watts of power until October 2010, WOCR operated on 89.7 with 125 watts of power. In certain areas the station would interfere with the signal of 89.7 WLNZ in Lansing; the frequency shift to 89.1 has alleviated this issue. WLNZ has since been granted a construction permit to increase power to 1,000 watts from its current 420.

WOCR "The One" is a full-service campus radio station featuring music, campus information, and sports programming, including play-by-play of Olivet College and local high school teams.

WOCR is the official station for Olivet Comets football and broadcasts all home and away games.

Personnel

Station managers
  89.7 Olivet College Radio
  1. Charles G. "Chuck" Mefford 1973-1976
  2. Michael Oyster             1976-1977
  3. Dana Potts                 1977
  4. Tom Trubac                 1978
  5. William Healy              1978-1979
  6. George Pohly               1979-1980
  7. Lisa Barry                 1980
  8. Stuart Blacklaw            1981
  9. Mark Cooper                1982
 10. Vincent Wheat              1982-1983
 11. Steven R Hoover            1983-1984
 12. Mary Frances Smith         1984-1985
 13. James C Shadduck           1985-1986
 14. Lisa Waltz                 1986-1987
 --- Lisa Waltz-Cook            FALL 1987
 15. Norine N Boyd              SPRING 1988
 16. Chris Parkinson            1988-1989
 17. Janice Meisel              SUMMER 1989
 18. Dan Davis                  FALL 1989
 19. Deb Breiling               SPRING 1990
 20. Paul H Ensley              1991-1992
 21. Jason Houchins             1992-1994
 22. Mike Adams                 1994-1995
 23. Carlos Sims                1995-1997
 24. Richard Craig              1997-1999
 25. Bill Bridges               1999-2000
 26. Chad Carlisle              2000-2001
 27. William E Shrubb III       2001-2002
 28. Elliot Hitchcock           2002-2003
 29. Jason Wright               2003-2004
 30. Nya Taryor                 2004-2005
 31. Karolyn Batt               2005-2007
 32. John E Shull               2007-2009
    REBRANDED AS 89.1 THE ONE WOCR
 33. Elizabeth F Mitchell       2009-2012
 34. Adrienne Plourde           2012-2014
 35. Travis Oberlin             2014-2016
 36. Danny Neugent              2016
 37. Co-Managers:         2016-2017
 37a. Corey Hricovsky
 37b. Bill Morris
 37c. Matt Scher
 38d. Thomas Gary-Homes
 39. Corey Hricovsky            2017-2018
 40. Crissta Ames               SPRING 2018
 41. Zack Evans                 2018–present

Faculty advisers
 Gary Smith
 Joanne Williams
 Daine Pavloski

Sports directors
Daine Pavloski 2011-2013
Travis Oberlin 2013-2016
Matt Scher 2016–2020

On-air talent
 Chuck Mefford 1975-1976
 Perry LaHaie 1981-1983
 Mike Oyster 
 John Shull
 Da Sooper Yooper 1990-1994
 Demetris Mayberry "HypeRadio" 2006-2010 
 Daine Pavloski "Professor of JMC at Olivet College" 2009-2013 
 Lindsey Basye
 Jefferson Matthews- "Play-By-Play, Initial Sports Director" 2005-2009
 Matthew Weaver- "Color Commentator, Initiator of WOCR's High School Football Broadcasts" 2009-2013
 Brittany Hayes
 Ashley Mallo 2011-2013
 Brittany Turner 2012-2013
 Kristen Sharpley 2012-2013
 Raquel Mazur 2012-2014
 Hailey Willett 2012-2013, 2016
 Andrew Brent 2012
 Adam Gross (2009-2013) and Mikeal Kennedy (2011-2014) "The Petition for Common Sense (2012-2013)"
 Morgan Hall 2013-2014
 Tyler Gross 2013-2014
 Travis Oberlin 
 Amber Hamad 
 Kori Ramirez 
 DJ Tate 5

References

External links
 
 Official Website

OCR
OCR
Radio stations established in 1975
Olivet College Media